Renate Rudolph (born 24 November 1949) is a former East German handball player, born in Leipzig, who competed in the 1980 Summer Olympics.

In 1980 she won the bronze medal with the East German team. She played all five matches.

External links
profile

1949 births
Living people
Sportspeople from Leipzig 
German female handball players
Handball players at the 1980 Summer Olympics
Olympic handball players of East Germany
Olympic bronze medalists for East Germany
Olympic medalists in handball
Medalists at the 1980 Summer Olympics